Nur Dhabitah binti Sabri  (born 12 July 1999) is a Malaysian  diver. She is the youngest Malaysian diver to champion two senior international competitions.

Early and personal life 
Dhabitah was born in Kuala Lumpur, Malaysia to Sabri Hashim and Fazidah Jaafar. She is the youngest among four siblings. Initially, she started her aquatic exposure through swimming clubs. After several competition, her father decided to switch her into diving due to her small body physique. She learned swimming and diving together with her older brother, Muhammad Danial Sabri. Both of them were planning to debut internationally together but unable due to Danial's traumatic physical injury sustained before the debut. She occasionally practices and delves into extreme sport such as parkour and trampoline as a hobby. Dhabitah is currently pursuing her studies in Bachelor of Media Communication at National University of Malaysia.

Career 

In June 2012, Dhabitah became the youngest Malaysian diver to win at a senior international competition by winning two events at the South-East Asia Swimming Championships in Singapore. At the 2013 SEA Games, Dhabitah won the gold medal in 10 meter synchronised platform with Leong Mun Yee.

At the 2014 Commonwealth Games in Glasgow, Dhabitah won the bronze medal in 10 meter synchronised platform with Pandelela Rinong. She also finished sixth in the 3 meter synchronised springboard with Ng Yan Yee and eleventh in 3 meter springboard individual.

At the 2015 SEA Games, Dhabitah and Ng Yan Yee won the gold medal in 3 meter synchronised springboard. In September 2015, after winning the women's 10 meter platform individual at the 2015 Asian Diving Cup, Dhabitah earned a slot to the 2016 Summer Olympics. In February 2016, Dhabitah and Cheong Jun Hoong earned an Olympic spot in the 3 meter synchronised springboard after finishing fifth at the Diving World Cup in Rio de Janeiro.

In her first event at the 2016 Summer Olympics, Dhabitah and Cheong Jun Hoong finished fifth in the 3 meter synchronized springboard. They were in bronze medal position after the third dive but a mistake by Cheong Jun Hoong in the fourth dive cost Dhabitah a first Olympic medal. Dhabitah advances to the final of 10 meter platform where she finished ninth with 338 points.

In April 2017, Dhabitah teamed up with Pandelela Rinong to bagged a silver in 10 meter synchronised platform in Windsor, Canada. It was her first medal in the Diving World Series. At the 2017 World Aquatics Championships in Budapest, Dhabitah reach the final of 3 meter springboard individual where she finished 10th with 292.35 points.

Dhabitah was chosen to light up the cauldron during the opening ceremony of the 2017 SEA Games in Kuala Lumpur. Dhabitah took silver in 3 meter springboard individual which was won by compatriot, Ng Yan Yee. Dhabitah would later partner with Ng Yan Yee to win gold in 3 meter synchronised springboard. In October 2017, they were stripped of their gold medal after Ng Yan Yee failed a doping test.

At the 2018 Commonwealth Games, Dhabitah won a bronze medal with Leong Mun Yee in the 3 meter synchronised springboard. They won another bronze medal in 10 meter synchronised platform. At the 2018 Asian Games, the pair won bronze in the 10 meter synchronised platform. In her second event of the Games, she got a silver with Ng Yan Yee in the 3 metre synchronized springboard. In her third event, she missed out on bronze medal after finishing in fourth place in the 1 metre springboard. In her last event, she won a bronze medal in the 3 metre springboard, finishing behind Shi Tingmao and Wang Han of China.

She competed at the 2022 Commonwealth Games where she won silver medals in the women's synchronised 3 metre springboard event alongside Ng Yan Yee and in the women's 3 metre springboard event, a bronze medal in the mixed synchronised 3 metre springboard event alongside Muhammad Syafiq Puteh and came 4th in the women's synchronised 10 metre platform alongside Pandelela Rinong.

Competition history

Malaysia National Competition

International Competition

Awards

Honours
  :
  Member of the Order of the Territorial Crown (AMW) (2019)

References

External links
 
 
 

1999 births
Living people
Sportspeople from Kuala Lumpur
Malaysian people of Malay descent
Malaysian Muslims
Malaysian female divers
Divers at the 2014 Commonwealth Games
Divers at the 2014 Asian Games
Divers at the 2016 Summer Olympics
Divers at the 2018 Commonwealth Games
Divers at the 2018 Asian Games
Divers at the 2020 Summer Olympics
Divers at the 2022 Commonwealth Games
Olympic divers of Malaysia
Commonwealth Games silver medallists for Malaysia
Commonwealth Games bronze medallists for Malaysia
Commonwealth Games medallists in diving
Southeast Asian Games gold medalists for Malaysia
Southeast Asian Games medalists in diving
Asian Games medalists in diving
Asian Games silver medalists for Malaysia
Asian Games bronze medalists for Malaysia
Medalists at the 2018 Asian Games
Competitors at the 2013 Southeast Asian Games
Competitors at the 2015 Southeast Asian Games
Competitors at the 2017 Southeast Asian Games
Competitors at the 2019 Southeast Asian Games
Competitors at the 2021 Southeast Asian Games
World Aquatics Championships medalists in diving
21st-century Malaysian women
Medallists at the 2014 Commonwealth Games
Medallists at the 2018 Commonwealth Games
Medallists at the 2022 Commonwealth Games